Secretary is a 2006 Australian television film. It was the pilot for a television series which was never produced.

Premise
A look at four secretaries and a receptionist at a law firm.

Cast
Pia Miranda as Nadia Baranova
Maeve Dermody as Morgan Wells
Kimberley Davies as Annabel
Jessica McNamee as Lucy Tuckett
Ming-Zhu Hii as Tamara Streeter
Vince Colosimo as Justin Gallagher
David Hoflin as Dick McKew
Peter O'Brien as Shane Cox
Susie Porter as Aviva Bloch
Dave Roberts as Ken Kehoe

Production
The pilot was made by Southern Star Entertainment for Channel Ten. It was from the same producer as The Secret Life of Us. Filming began in June 2006 in Melbourne.

Channel Ten passed on the series in September 2006. Network programmer David Mott said at the time the show had not "come up to a standard we were comfortable with". A copy of the pilot episode was uploaded to the internet for a time.

References

External links
Secretary at Screen Australia
Secretary at Australian Television

Television films as pilots
Television pilots not picked up as a series
Australian television films
2006 films
2000s English-language films